Shamsul Haque politician of Satkhira District of Bangladesh, writer, Bengali language movement soldier, lawyer and former member of Parliament for Satkhira-2 constituency in February 1996.

Career 
Shamsul Haque was a writer, Bengali language movement soldier and lawyer. He was the district president of Bangladesh Nationalist Party Satkhira. He was arrested in Satkhira on 22 February 1952 on charges of Bangla language movement. He was elected to parliament from Satkhira-2 as a Bangladesh Nationalist Party candidate in 15 February 1996 Bangladeshi general election.

In the first parliamentary elections of 1973, he was defeated by the then Khulna-13 constituency with the nomination of the National Awami Party and in the second parliamentary elections of 1979 with the nomination of the Bangladesh Nationalist Party from the then Khulna-14 constituency.

References 

Year of death unknown
Date of birth missing
People from Satkhira District
Bangladesh Nationalist Party politicians
6th Jatiya Sangsad members